The Brotherhood of the Holy Sepulchre or Holy Community of the All-Holy Sepulchre is an Eastern Orthodox monastic fraternity guarding the Church of the Holy Sepulchre and other Christian holy places in the Holy Land, founded in its present form during the British Mandate in Palestine (1920-1948). Headed by the Greek Orthodox Patriarch of Jerusalem, the brotherhood also administers the Greek Orthodox Church of Jerusalem, such as metropolitans, archbishops, bishops, archimandrites, hieromonks, hierodeacons, and monks.

Their symbol is the taphos symbol, a monogram of the Greek letters tau and phi, for the word  (meaning "sepulchre, grave"). It can be seen on most Greek Orthodox buildings in Jerusalem.

Their seat is the Central Monastery of Saints Constantine and Helen, Jerusalem, northeast of Megali Panagia Nunnery.

Name
A sepulchre is a burial chamber and in this case Holy Sepulchre refers to the burial chamber of Jesus, what is believed to be his tomb inside the Church of the Holy Sepulchre.

History

Organisation
Jordanian Law No. 227, dated 16 January 1958, regulates the Brotherhood's government.

Holy places
 The Church of the Nativity in Bethlehem
 The site of Christ's baptism in the River Jordan (Al-Maghtas & Qasr el Yahud)
 Mount Tabor
 Nazareth, the city of the Annunciation (the Church of St Gabriel)
 The Sea of Galilee (also known as the Lake of Gennesaret and the Sea of Tiberias)
 Capernaum, the "Town of Jesus"
 Cana
 Jacob's Well in Nablus.

Status quo

After the renovation of 1555, control of the Church of the Holy Sepulchre oscillated between the Franciscans and the Orthodox, depending on which community could obtain a favorable firman from the Sublime Porte at a particular time, often through outright bribery, and violent clashes were not uncommon. In 1757, weary of the squabbling, the Porte issued a firman that divided the church among the claimants. This was confirmed in 1852 with another firman that made the arrangement permanent, establishing a status quo of territorial division among the communities.

The primary custodians are the Greek Orthodox Church, which has the lion's share, the Custodian of the Holy Land, an official of the Franciscans and affiliated with the Roman Catholic Church, and the Eastern Orthodox, Armenian Apostolic Churches. In the 19th century, the Coptic Orthodox, the Ethiopian Orthodox and the Syriac Orthodox acquired lesser responsibilities, which include shrines and other structures within and around the building. Times and places of worship for each community are strictly regulated in common areas.

Under the status quo, no part of what is designated as common territory may be so much as rearranged without consent from all communities. This often leads to the neglect of badly needed repairs when the communities cannot come to an agreement among themselves about the final shape of a project. Just such a disagreement has delayed the renovation of the edicule, where the need is now dire, but also where any change in the structure might result in a change to the status quo disagreeable to one or more of the communities.

A less grave sign of this state of affairs is located on a window ledge over the church's entrance. Someone placed a wooden ladder there sometime before 1852, when the status quo defined both the doors and the window ledges as common ground. The ladder remains there to this day, in almost exactly the same position. It can be seen to occupy the ledge in century-old photographs and engravings.

None of the communities controls the main entrance. In 1192, Saladin assigned responsibility for it to a Muslim family. The Joudeh Al-Goudia a noble family with a long history were entrusted with the keys as custodians. This arrangement has persisted into modern times.

Breaches of the status quo
The establishment of the status quo did not halt the violence, which continues to break out every so often even in modern times. For example, on a hot summer day in 2002, a Coptic monk who is stationed on the roof to express Coptic claims to the Ethiopian territory there moved his chair from its agreed spot into the shade. This was interpreted as a hostile move by the Ethiopians, leading to a fracas, with eleven people being hospitalized.

In another incident in 2004 during Orthodox celebrations of the Exaltation of the Holy Cross, a door to the Franciscan chapel was left open. This was taken as a sign of disrespect by the Orthodox and a fistfight broke out. Some people were arrested, but no one was seriously injured.

On Palm Sunday, in April 2008, a brawl broke out due to a Greek monk being ejected from the building by a rival faction. Police were called to the scene but were also attacked by the enraged brawlers. A clash erupted between Armenian and Greek monks on Sunday 9 November 2008, during celebrations for the Feast of the Holy Cross.

See also
Greek Orthodox Patriarch of Jerusalem
Fathers of the Holy Sepulchre
Custody of the Holy Land
Order of the Holy Sepulchre
Palestinian Christians

References

External links
The Brotherhood of the Holy Sepulchre at the Jerusalem Patriarchate
An Historical Glance at the Brotherhood of the Holy Sepulcher by St. Raphael of Brooklyn

Christianity in the Arab world
Christianity in Jerusalem
Greek Orthodox Church of Jerusalem
Eastern Orthodox Church bodies in Asia
Organizations based in Jerusalem
Church of the Holy Sepulchre